Oscar Valero Cruz,  (17 November 1934 – 26 August 2020) was a Filipino prelate of the Catholic Church in the Philippines. He was the Archbishop of Lingayen–Dagupan in Pangasinan, Philippines, from 1991 to 2009.

Biography
Oscar Cruz was born on 17 November 1934 in Balanga, Bataan, Philippines. He received his seminary training at the University of Santo Tomas Central Seminary, and further theology studies at the Lateran University.

His priestly ordination was on 8 February 1962, and his episcopal consecration on 3 May 1976. He was the first Filipino rector of San Carlos Seminary of the Archdiocese of Manila from 1973 to 1978. He was an auxiliary bishop of Manila (1976–1978) and archbishop of the Archdiocese of San Fernando (1978–1988). He served as a judicial vicar of the Catholic Bishops' Conference of the Philippines (CBCP) National Tribunal of Appeals, and director of the CBCP Legal Office. He was appointed Archbishop of Lingayen-Dagupan on 15 July 1991.

Cruz published many books, including CBCP Guidelines on Sexual Abuse and Misconduct: A Critique, and Call of the Laity.

Controversy
Manila RTC, Branch 52 Judge Antonio Rosales on 14 May 2008, issued the warrant of arrest, granted the P10,000 bail motion, and Archbishop Oscar V. Cruz posted bail. Libel cases were filed against him after he accused the Philippine Amusement and Gaming Corp. (PAGCOR) of using female staff to act like "guest relations officers (GROs)" during the 2004 birthday celebration of First Gentleman Jose Miguel Arroyo. His arraignment was set on 17 June.

Retirement
On 8 September 2009, Pope Benedict XVI accepted the retirement of Archbishop Cruz. He was replaced by Bishop Socrates B. Villegas of the Diocese of Balanga.

Death
Cruz died from complications of multiple organ failure caused by COVID-19 on 26 August 2020, at age 85, at 5: 00 AM, during the COVID-19 pandemic in the Philippines.

See also
 List of Filipino bishops

References

External links

 
 Viewpoints: Personal Views and Commentaries
 CBCP Online, Profile of Oscar V. Cruz 

1934 births
2020 deaths
20th-century Roman Catholic archbishops in the Philippines
21st-century Roman Catholic archbishops in the Philippines
Deaths from the COVID-19 pandemic in the Philippines
People from Pampanga
People from Pangasinan
People from San Juan, Metro Manila
Presidents of the Catholic Bishops' Conference of the Philippines
Roman Catholic archbishops of Lingayen–Dagupan
Roman Catholic archbishops of San Fernando
University of Santo Tomas alumni